Midongy Atsimo or Midongy Sud is a district in the region of Atsimo-Atsinanana in Madagascar.

Communes
The district is further divided into six communes:

 Andranolalina
 Ampatramary
 Mahasoa Analatelo
 Haramanga
 Ambararata, Andranolalina
 Anevandava
 Ampatranila
 Antanambao, Andranolalina
 Antanandava, Andranolalina
 Ankazovelo
 Ambasohihy
 Ampasy
 Ankazomanga
 Bemahala
 Mahazoarivo
 Nanatotsikora
 Telorano
 Voanana
 Ivondro
 Ampasy
 Analaiva, Ivondro
 Ankarindro
 Benonoka
 Lavaraty
 Mahazoarivo
 Makojano
 Sahatsoro
 Nosifeno
 Amboniasy
 Ankarinoro, Nosifeno
 Beharena, Nosifeno
 Bekofafa
 Manombo
 Maroangaty
 Milahila
 Morondava, Nosifeno
 Nanarena
 Vohimanoro
 Soakibany
 Amboangy
 Ambodijoho
 Anezandava Est
 Antaramiery
 Bearaotra
 Fasikendry
 Mahasoa, Soakibany
 Zara Maliorano
 Ambodisahy
 Ankalatany
 Beharena, Zara
 Bevaho
 Mahabe, Zara
 Marovovo
 Mikaiky
 Sahanety
 Tsararano, Zara

Nature
Most of the area of the Midongy du sud National Park is situated on the territory of this district.

References

Districts of Atsimo-Atsinanana